This article shows a list of concerts and other entertainment shows held at the Crypto.com Arena. The busiest arena in California has hosted many local, regional and international artists since its opening in 1999. A list of entertainment events are given in the tables below in chronological order.

1999–2010

2011–present

References 

Entertainment events at Staples Center
Entertainment events in the United States
Events in Los Angeles
Lists of events by venue
Lists of events in the United States
Entertainment events at Staples Center